Louder refers to an increase in loudness.

Louder may also refer to:

Persons
Alexis Louder, American actress
Alison Louder, Canadian actress
Earle Louder, musician specialising in playing euphonium, professor of music
Jeff Louder (born 1977), American road racing cyclist

Music
 Louder (Lea Michele album)
 "Louder" (Lea Michele song), single from Lea Michele album above
 Louder (R5 album)
Louder Tour, 2014 concert tour by R5 to promote their album above
Louder!, an album by Sofía Reyes
 "Louder" (Charice song)
 "Louder" (DJ Fresh song)
 "Louder" (DJ MuscleBoy song)
 "Louder" (Neon Jungle song)
 "Louder" (Parade song)
 "Louder", a song by All That Remains from the album Madness, 2017
 Louder, or Louder Sound, is the parent brand of Metal Hammer, Prog and Classic Rock magazines since 2017

See also
Louder, Louder!, debut album by American rock band Killola
Loud (disambiguation)